Hendrik "Henk" Jacob van der Wal (20 August 1886 in Rotterdam – 4 August 1982 in Rotterdam) was a Dutch athlete.  He competed at the 1908 Summer Olympics in London.

Van der Wal lost in the preliminary heats of the 200 metres, placing third to Harold Huff and Edward Duffy.  In the 400 metres, van der Wal again was eliminated in the preliminary heats following his fourth-place finish in the four-man heat. He did not finish his semifinal heat of the 800 metres.

References

Sources
 
 
 
 

1886 births
1982 deaths
Dutch male sprinters
Dutch male middle-distance runners
Athletes (track and field) at the 1908 Summer Olympics
Olympic athletes of the Netherlands
Athletes from Rotterdam